Tang Hui-ting is a Taiwanese taekwondo practitioner. She won a gold medal at the 1986 Asian Taekwondo Championships. She won a bronze medal in welterweight at the 1987 World Taekwondo Championships.

References

External links

Year of birth missing (living people) 
Living people
Taiwanese female taekwondo practitioners
Asian Taekwondo Championships medalists
World Taekwondo Championships medalists
20th-century Taiwanese women